The Knesset Land of Israel Caucus, also known as the Eretz Israel Caucus, is a lobby group within the Knesset whose goal is "to strengthen the State of Israel’s hold" on the West Bank. It is one of the largest and most active lobby groups within the Knesset.

The current Chairmen of the caucus are Bezalel Smotrich and Yoav Kish.

See also
 Knesset Christian Allies Caucus

Website

References

Knesset